Paralobesia liriodendrana, the tulip-tree leaftier moth, is a species of tortricid moth in the family Tortricidae.

The MONA or Hodges number for Paralobesia liriodendrana is 2711.

References

Further reading

External links

 

Olethreutini
Moths described in 1904